Rookery Nook was a 1953 British live television production of the comedy play by Ben Travers broadcast on 23 May 1953. Featuring in this version were Peter Cushing, David Stoll, and Lally Bowers. 

It was based on Travers' play Rookery Nook, one of the Aldwych Farces, and is believed not to have been telerecorded as it was transmitted and is therefore lost.

Cast
 Joy Adamson ...  Poppy Dickie 
 Beryl Bainbridge ...  Rhoda Marley 
 Lally Bowers ...  Gertrude Twine 
 Edgar K. Bruce ...  Putz 
 Peter Cushing ...  Clive Popkiss 
 Ian Fleming ...  Admiral Juddy 
 David Kossoff ...  Harold Twine 
 Tonie MacMillan ...  Mrs. Leverett 
 Audrey O'Flynn ...  Mrs. Possett 
 Anne Padwick ...  Clara Popkiss 
 David Stoll ...  Gerald Popkiss

References

External links

1953 television plays
1953 plays
BBC television comedy
Television articles with incorrect naming style